This is a list of the best-selling albums of recorded music in South Korea. To appear on the list, the figure must have been published by a reliable source and the album must have sold at least 1 million copies. As of 2022, Map of the Soul: 7 by South Korean boy band BTS is the best-selling album of all time in the country. Released in February 2020, the studio album claimed the record with over 4.1 million copies sold in less than a month. Kim Gun-mo's 1995 studio album Wrongful Meeting previously held the record as the best-selling South Korean album for 24 years, with an estimated 3.3 million copies sold—this includes figures based on illegal sales—until it was surpassed by BTS' Map of the Soul: Persona in 2019.

The Korea Video & Record Distributors Association (KVRDA) published the first South Korean sales charts, tallying album sales figures for the month of August and the March-August semester, on September 10, 1998. Between 1999 and 2007, the Music Industry Association of Korea (MIAK) published monthly charts, with fifty chart positions and detailed sales for each album. Following the sharp decline of domestic music sales in the 21st century, the Korea Music Content Association (KMCA) introduced the Gaon Album Chart in February 2010, which included a detailed breakdown of online chart data. The KMCA began awarding sales certifications for albums in April 2018—only albums released after January 1, 2018 are eligible. Certifications are not included in this list, because the Gaon Music Chart publishes detailed album sales.

All albums that have sold over one million copies in South Korea are by Korean artists, with the exception of Whitney Houston's The Bodyguard (1992) and Mariah Carey's Music Box (1993). BTS is the act with the most million-selling albums, having eleven, followed by Seventeen, with seven. BTS' Love Yourself: Her became the first album released since 2001 to sell over 1 million copies in 2017, and BTS' Love Yourself: Answer became the first album to sell over 2 million copies since 2000 in 2018. BTS' Map of the Soul: Persona became the first album to sell over 3 million copies since 1997 in 2019. This was followed by Map of the Soul: 7, which became the first album ever to surpass 4 million sales in 2020, and later 5 million sales in 2022. In 2013, the combined sales of Exo's XOXO and its repackage exceeded 1 million copies, and in 2019 BTS became the first act to sell 1 million copies of both an album and its repackage, with Wings and You Never Walk Alone each surpassing 1 million sales.

Legend

2 million or more copies

1 million–1.9 million copies

Best-selling album by year
Sales of standard release and reissue albums in a year. This list does not include sales of the same album in other years apart from the specified calendar year. For a list of total sales, see sections above.

See also

 List of best-selling singles in South Korea
 List of certified albums in South Korea

Notes

References

South Korea
South Korean music-related lists